The 2017–18 Egyptian Super Cup (also known as the 2017–18 SAIB Egyptian Super Cup for sponsorship reasons) was the 15th edition of the Egyptian Super Cup, an annual football match between the winners of the previous season's Egyptian Premier League and Egypt Cup. The match is usually contested by the winners of the Premier League and the Egypt Cup, but since Al Ahly won the double (2016–17 Egyptian Premier League and 2016–17 Egypt Cup), Al Masry qualified by default as the runners-up of the cup. The match was played for the third consecutive time in the United Arab Emirates at the Hazza Bin Zayed Stadium in Al Ain, Abu Dhabi. Al Ahly won the match 1–0 at extra time, after the match finished 0–0 after 90 minutes.

Details

References

Egyptian Super Cup
2017–18 in Egyptian football
Al Ahly SC matches
Al-Masry SC matches